Trapdoor Fucking Exit is the third studio album by The Dead C, released in 1990 through Precious Metal.

Legacy 
In 1998, The Wire included Trapdoor Fucking Exit in their list of "100 Records That Set the World on Fire (While No One Was Listening)". The staff described the album as "the sound of three newly freed New Zealanders wrestling with the implications of punk-primitive aesthetics in the wake of US/Euro free jazz ground leveling. Two broken guitars and a rapid-firing drummer, playing lead, singlehandedly redefined the concept of garage punk without any considerations of melody, rhythm or fidelity."

Track listing

Personnel 
Adapted from Trapdoor Fucking Exit liner notes.

The Dead C
 Michael Morley – guitar, vocals
 Bruce Russell – guitar, drums
 Robbie Yeats – drums, guitar

Additional musicians
 Chris Heazlewood – additional guitar (3, 4, 7–10)

Release history

References

External links 
 

1990 albums
The Dead C albums
Garage punk albums